Aricanduva is a municipality in the northeast of the Brazilian state of Minas Gerais.   the population was 5,269 in a total area of 243 km².  The elevation is 682 meters.  It is part of the IBGE statistical meso-region of Jequitinhonha and the micro-region of Capelinha.  It became a municipality in 1995.

The economy is based on cattle raising and agriculture, with the main crops being coffee, sugarcane, and corn.  There were plantations of eucalyptus trees for charcoal production.  In 2005 there were 622 rural producers but only 7 tractors.   there were no hospitals and 3 public health clinics.  Educational needs were met by 11 primary schools and 1 middle school.  There were 114 automobiles in 2006, giving a ratio of 45 inhabitants per automobile.  There were no banks in 2007.

Neighboring municipalities are: Capelinha, Itamarandiba and São Sebastião do Maranhão.  The distance to Belo Horizonte is 419 km.  The nearest major population center, Capelinha, is 15 km. on secondary roads.

Municipal Human Development Index

Aricanduva is ranked very low on the MHDI and was one of the poorest municipalities in the state and in the country in 2000.  
MHDI: .636 (2000)
State ranking: 773 out of 853 municipalities
National ranking: 3,996 out of 5,138 municipalities in 2000
Life expectancy: 70
Literacy rate: 67 (For the complete list see Frigoletto)
Combined primary, secondary and tertiary gross enrolment ratio: .728
Per capita income (monthly): R$80.00 
Urbanization rate: 24.91
Percentage of urban residences connected to sewage system: 65.70
Infant mortality rate: 65.93 (the national average was 18.91).

The above figures can be compared with those of Poços de Caldas, which had an MHDI of .841, the highest in the state of Minas Gerais.  The highest in the country was São Caetano do Sul in the state of São Paulo with an MHDI of .919.  The lowest was Manari in the state of Pernambuco with an MHDI of .467 out of a total of 5504 municipalities in the country .  At last count Brazil had 5,561 municipalities so this might have changed at the time of this writing.

See also
List of municipalities in Minas Gerais

References

Municipalities in Minas Gerais